Pterynotus is a genus of sea snails, marine gastropod mollusks in the subfamily Muricinae of the family Muricidae, the murex snails or rock snails.

Species
Species within the genus Pterynotus include:

 Pterynotus alatus (Röding, 1798)
 Pterynotus albobrunneus Bertsch & D'Attilio, 1980
 Pterynotus aparrii D'Attilio & Bertsch, 1980
 Pterynotus barclayanus (H. Adams, 1873)
 Pterynotus bibbeyi (Radwin & D'Attilio, 1976)
 Pterynotus bipinnatus (Reeve, 1845)
 Pterynotus bouteti Houart, 1990
 Pterynotus elaticus (Houart, 2000)
 Pterynotus elongatus (Lightfoot, 1786)
 Pterynotus laurae Houart, 1997
 Pterynotus martinetana (Röding, 1798)
 Pterynotus patagiatus (Hedley, 1912)
 Pterynotus pellucidus (Reeve, 1845)
 † Pterynotus pseuderinaceus (Boettger, 1902) 
 Pterynotus tripterus (Born, 1778) 

Species brought into synonymy  
 Pterynotus atlantideus Bouchet & Warén, 1985: synonym of Timbellus atlantideus (Bouchet & Warén, 1985)
 Pterynotus bednalli (Brazier, 1878): synonym of Timbellus bednalli (Brazier, 1878)
 Pterynotus brianbaileyi Mühlhäusser, 1984: synonym of Chicoreus brianbaileyi (Mühlhäusser, 1984) (original combination)
 Pterynotus bushae Vokes, 1970 accepted as Timbellus phaneus (Dall, 1889) (synonym)
 Pterynotus celinamarumai Kosuge, 1980 accepted as Chicoreus orchidiflorus (Shikama, 1973) (emmendation pro cerinamarumai)
 Pterynotus cerinamarumai Kosuge, 1980 accepted as Chicoreus orchidiflorus (Shikama, 1973)
 Pterynotus concavopterus Kosuge, 1980: synonym of Timbellus concavopterus (Kosuge, 1980)
 Pterynotus crauroptera Houart, 1991: synonym of Timbellus crauroptera (Houart, 1991)
 Pterynotus emilyae Espinosa, Ortea & Fernandez-Garcés, 2007: synonym of Timbellus emilyae (Espinosa, Ortea & Fernández-Garcés, 2007) (original combination)
 Pterynotus fernandezi Houart, 2000: synonym of Timbellus fernandezi (Houart, 2000)
 Pterynotus flemingi Beu, 1967: synonym of Timbellus flemingi (Beu, 1967)
 Pterynotus fulgens Houart, 1988: synonym of Timbellus fulgens (Houart, 1988)
 Pterynotus gambiensis Reeve, 1845: synonym of Purpurellus gambiensis (Reeve, 1845)
 Pterynotus gouldi A. Adams, 1863 accepted as Ceratostoma burnettii (Reeve, 1849) (synonym)
 Pterynotus guesti Harasewych & Jensen, 1979: synonym of  Timbellus guesti (Harasewych & Jensen, 1979)
 Pterynotus guillei Houart, 1985 accepted as Chicoreus guillei Houart, 1985 (original combination)
 Pterynotus havanensis Vokes, 1970: synonym of Timbellus havanensis (Vokes, 1970)
 † Pterynotus kaiparaensis C. A. Fleming, 1962 accepted as † Timbellus kaiparaensis (C. A. Fleming, 1962)
 Pterynotus leucas (Fischer in Locard, 1897): synonym of Timbellus leucas (Locard, 1897)
 Pterynotus levii Houart, 1988: synonym of Timbellus levii (Houart, 1988)
 Pterynotus lightbourni Harasewych & Jensen, 1979: synonym of Timbellus lightbourni (Harasewych & Jensen, 1979)
 Pterynotus loebbeckei (Kobelt, In Loebbecke & Kobelt, 1879): synonym of Chicoreus loebbeckei (Kobelt, 1879)
 Pterynotus macleani Emerson & D'Attilio, 1969 accepted as Purpurellus macleani (Emerson & D'Attilio, 1969) (original combination)
 Pterynotus marshalli Houart, 1989: synonym of Timbellus marshalli (Houart, 1989)
 Pterynotus miyokoae Kosuge, 1979: synonym of Timbellus miyokoae (Kosuge, 1979)
 Pterynotus orchidiflorus Shikama, 1973 accepted as Chicoreus orchidiflorus (Shikama, 1973) (original combination)
 Pterynotus phaneus (Dall, 1889): synonym of Timbellus phaneus (Dall, 1889)
 Pterynotus phyllopterus (Lamarck, 1822): synonym of Timbellus phyllopterus (Lamarck, 1822)
 Pterynotus pinnatus (Swainson, 1822) accepted as Pterynotus alatus (Röding, 1798)
 Pterynotus pinniger (Broderip, 1833) accepted as Purpurellus pinniger (Broderip, 1833)
 Pterynotus purpureus Azuma, 1976 accepted as Pterynotus barclayanus (H. Adams, 1873) (synonym)
 Pterynotus radwini Harasewych & Jensen, 1979: synonym of Timbellus radwini (Harasewych & Jensen, 1979)
 Pterynotus richeri Houart, 1986: synonym of Timbellus richeri (Houart, 1987)
 Pterynotus rubidus Houart, 2001: synonym of Timbellus rubidus (Houart, 2001)
 Pterynotus stenostoma Houart, 1991: synonym of Timbellus stenostoma (Houart, 1991)
 Pterynotus swansoni Hertlein & A. M. Strong, 1951 accepted as Pteropurpura centrifuga (Hinds, 1844)
 Pterynotus triquetor Born, 1778: synonym of  Naquetia triqueter (Born, 1778)
 Pterynotus vespertillo (Kuroda in Kira, 1959): synonym of Timbellus vespertilio (Kuroda in Kira, 1959)
 Pterynotus xenos Harasewych, 1982: synonym of Timbellus xenos (Harasewych, 1982)

References

 Ponder, W.F. (1972). Notes on some Australian genera and species of the family Muricidae (Neogastropoda). Journal of the Malacological Society of Australia 2: 215–248.
 Spencer, H.; Marshall. B. (2009). All Mollusca except Opisthobranchia. In: Gordon, D. (Ed.) (2009). New Zealand Inventory of Biodiversity. Volume One: Kingdom Animalia. 584 pp
 Merle D., Garrigues B. & Pointier J.-P. (2011) Fossil and Recent Muricidae of the world. Part Muricinae. Hackenheim: Conchbooks. 648 pp.

External links
  Jousseaume, F. P. (1880). Division méthodique de la famille des Purpuridés. Le Naturaliste. 2(42): 335-338
 Houart, R. (1995). Pterymarchia n. gen. and Vaughtia n. gen., two new muricid genera (Gastropoda: Muricidae: Muricinae and Ocenebrinae). Apex. 10 (4): 127-136
 Gofas, S.; Le Renard, J.; Bouchet, P. (2001). Mollusca, in: Costello, M.J. et al. (Ed.) (2001). European register of marine species: a check-list of the marine species in Europe and a bibliography of guides to their identification. Collection Patrimoines Naturels, 50: pp. 180–213

 
Muricidae